Gilda Oliveira (born 6 August 1983) is a Brazilian freestyle wrestler.

She competed at the 2016 Summer Olympics in Rio de Janeiro, in the women's freestyle 69 kg.

References

External links
 

1983 births
Living people
Brazilian female sport wrestlers
Olympic wrestlers of Brazil
Wrestlers at the 2016 Summer Olympics
South American Games gold medalists for Brazil
South American Games medalists in wrestling
Competitors at the 2014 South American Games
20th-century Brazilian women
21st-century Brazilian women